is a Japanese football player. He plays for Gainare Tottori.

Career
Yuya Nishijima joined J3 League club Gainare Tottori in 2017.

References

External links

1995 births
Living people
Fukuoka University alumni
Association football people from Yamaguchi Prefecture
Japanese footballers
J3 League players
Gainare Tottori players
Association football defenders